Yannis Fagras (Greek: Γιάννης Φάγκρας) is a Greek filmmaker. He studied film production and theory in New York City. His first feature film, “Still Looking for Morphine”, won the Association of Greek Film Critics award for best film at the 42nd Thessaloniki International Film Festival. It had a commercial release, was presented at international film festivals and was included in Sight & Sound magazine’s list of “75 hidden gems” of world cinema. His second feature “Forget Me Not”, shot mostly in Alaska and the Bering Sea, premiered in the 55th Thessaloniki International Film Festival had a commercial release and was presented in international film festivals and showcases

References

External links 
https://www.amazon.com/Still-Looking-Morphine-Ekavi-Douma/dp/B06VVJNW1B
https://www.youtube.com/watch?v=SaJVS8bjtiY&t=4s
 http://tiff.filmfestival.gr/default.aspx?lang=en-US&page=1216&SectionID=247&MovieID=2751

Greek film directors
Living people
Year of birth missing (living people)